The Minister for Lands, also called the Secretary for Lands was responsible for one of the key issues for the colonial administration of New South Wales, being the contest between squatters and selectors to dispossess the Aboriginal people of their land.

Role and responsibilities
The land issue dominated the politics of the late 1850s, and in October 1859, towards the end of the second Cowper ministry, the Secretary for Public Works was split off from the Secretary for Lands and Works. This enabled John Robertson to concentrate on what became known as the Robertson Land Acts. The Cowper ministry fell at the end of October 1859, replaced by the short lived Forster ministry. Robertson formed his first ministry in March 1860. While the four previous Premiers held the office of Colonial Secretary, Robertson chose to be Secretary for Lands.

The main work of the department at this time was processing the selection claims, including the various commissioners for Crown Lands and the necessary survey work under the Surveyor General. The minister had numerous other responsibilities, including immigration until 1869, mining until 1874 and forestry until 1908.

In the Holman Nationalist ministry from November 1916 William Ashford held the portfolios of Secretary for Lands and Minister for Forests and it became increasingly common for the minister to hold the portfolio along with other portfolios. In 1981 the Department of lands was temporarily amalgamated with the Department of Local Government, with the minister Lin Gordon holding both portfolios, until the departments were separated again in February 1984. The portfolio of Minister for Lands was abolished in April 1984 and replaced by the Minister for Natural Resources whose responsibilities included waterways, reserves and parks, forestry. The porfolio was briefly re-established in 1986, 1990 and 2004.

List of Secretaries and Ministers for Lands

Former ministerial titles

References

Defunct government positions of New South Wales